Belgica albipes is a species of non-flying lake fly first described by Eugène Séguy in 1965. Belgica albipes is part of the genus Belgica and the family Chironomidae. The insect lives in the Crozet Islands.

References

Bibliography
  1973: Observations on the distribution of surface-living land arthropods on the Subantarctic Île de la Possession, Îles Crozet. Journal of natural history, 7: 241–253. 
  1965: Deux nouveaux Tendipedides des Iles Crozet (Insetes Dipteres Nematoceres). Bull. Mus. natn. Hist. nat. Paris, 37: 285–289.
  1982: Description du male de Belgica albipes (SÉGUY, 1965), n. comb., rare chironomidé microptère des iles Crozet (Diptera). Revue française d'entomologie, 4: 97–100.

albipes
Insects of Antarctica
Fauna of the Crozet Islands
Insects described in 1965